Optical Engineering is a monthly peer-reviewed scientific journal covering research, development, and uses of optical science and optical engineering, published by SPIE. The editor-in-chief is Adam Wax (Duke University, USA). Past editors include Michael Eismann.

Abstracting and indexing
The journal is abstracted and indexed in:
 Science Citation Index
 Current Contents - Physical, Chemical & Earth Sciences
 Current Contents - Engineering, Computing & Technology
 Inspec
 Scopus
 Ei/Compendex
 Astrophysics Data System
According to the Journal Citation Reports, the journal has a 2020 impact factor of 1.084.

References

External links
 

Monthly journals
Optics journals
Engineering journals
SPIE academic journals
English-language journals
Publications established in 1962